Pang Yang is a village in Matman Township, Shan State. It is part of the Wa Self-Administered Division.

Geography
Matman is located on a hillside about 10 km northeast of the Salween.

Further reading
 Matman Township - Shan State - Mimu

References

Populated places in Shan State